Kejimikujik lake (sometimes Kejimkujik or even Kedgeemakoogee) is the namesake lake and the largest lake in Kejimkujik National Park and the second largest freshwater lake in Nova Scotia after Lake Rossignol. The word 'Kejimkujik' is agreed by all to be a word derived from the Mi'kmaq language, but depending on the source will be said to mean "attempting to escape" or "swollen waters". The park's official stance is that Kejimkujik is a Mi'kmaq word meaning "little fairies".

The lake is featured in The Tent Dwellers by Albert Bigelow Paine, a book chronicling his fishing trip through the central Nova Scotia wilds in the early 1900s.

External links
https://web.archive.org/web/20051217061221/http://www.ilec.or.jp/database/nam/nam-56.html The World Lakes Database entry on Kejimkujik Lake.
https://www.pc.gc.ca/en/pn-np/ns/kejimkujik/nature Kejimkujik National Park and National Historic Site, Nature and science.

Lakes of Nova Scotia
Landforms of Annapolis County, Nova Scotia
Region of Queens Municipality
Landforms of Queens County, Nova Scotia